Harry Lewis Babcock (August 12, 1930December 6, 1996) was an American football end in the National Football League. He was the first overall selection in the 1953 NFL Draft.

References

1930 births
1996 deaths
People from West Nyack, New York
Players of American football from New York (state)
American football wide receivers
Georgia Bulldogs football players
National Football League first-overall draft picks
San Francisco 49ers players